Campo di Marte (Italian: Field of Mars) was a literary magazine published briefly from 1938 to 1939 in Florence, Italy.

History and profile
Campo di Marte was established by Vasco Pratolini and Alfonso Gatto in August 1938. They also edited the magazine, which had its headquarters in Florence.

Campo di Marte declared its goal as "to educate the people" about the arts. It had a sceptical approach towards the European avant-garde and modernist experience as well as to mass culture. The magazine had an anti-fascist political leaning. It openly questioned several aspects of the fascist regime in Italy. It was subjected to censorship and closed down by the regime in August 1939 after only twelve issues.

See also
 List of magazines in Italy

References

1938 establishments in Italy
1939 disestablishments in Italy
Anti-fascism in Italy
Censorship in Italy
Defunct literary magazines published in Italy
Italian-language magazines
Magazines established in 1938
Magazines disestablished in 1939
Magazines published in Florence
Weekly magazines published in Italy
Banned magazines